The AACTA Award for Best Guest or Supporting Actress in a Television Drama is an accolade given by the Australian Academy of Cinema and Television Arts (AACTA), a non-profit organisation whose aim is to "identify, award, promote and celebrate Australia's greatest achievements in film and television." The award is handed out at the annual AACTA Awards, which rewards achievements in feature film, television, documentaries and short films. From 2000 to 2010, the category was presented by the Australian Film Institute (AFI), the Academy's parent organisation, at the annual Australian Film Institute Awards (known as the AFI Awards). When the AFI launched the Academy in 2011, it changed the annual ceremony to the AACTA Awards, with the current prize being a continuum of the AFI Award for Best Guest or Supporting Actress in a Television Drama.

The award was first presented in 2000 as Best Performance by an Actress in a Guest Role in a Television Drama Series until 2002, when the title was changed to Best Guest or Supporting Actress in a Television Drama. In the following year, the title was changed to Best Actress in a Supporting or Guest Role in a Television Drama or Comedy. By 2006, a separate comedy accolade was established, and the name changed to the current one.

The AACTA Award for Best Guest or Supporting Actress in a Television Drama is given for performances in television drama series, miniseries, telefeature, children's animation or children's drama series. Candidates for this award must be human and female, and cannot be nominated for best lead actress in a television drama in the same year, for the same production. Sacha Horler and Magda Szubanski have received two nominations each, more than any other actress in this category, with Szubanski winning one in 2000.

Winners and nominees
In the following table, the years listed correspond to the year that the television programme aired on Australian television; the ceremonies are usually held the following year. The actress whose name is emphasised in boldface and highlighted in yellow have won the award. Those that are neither highlighted nor in bold are the nominees. When sorted chronologically, the table always lists the winning actress first and then the other nominees.

Best Performance by an Actress in a Guest Role in a Television Drama Series

Best Actress in a Supporting or Guest Role in a Television Drama

Best Actress in a Supporting or Guest Role in a Television Drama or Comedy

Best Guest or Supporting Actress in Television Drama

See also
 AACTA Award for Best Guest or Supporting Actor in a Television Drama
 AACTA Awards

Notes

B: Natalia Novikova is currently known as Natasha Novak, but was credited under the aforementioned name in SeaChange.

References

AACTA Awards
Television awards for Best Supporting Actress